The 1936 Soviet First League spring season was the first second tier tournament of the Soviet official football competitions. The season started on May 22, 1936, and stretched through July 15, 1936. The only game between the capital's teams Stalinets and Serp i Molot took place at the Stalinets Stadium (used to stand where today Lokomotiv Stadium stands).

Spring 1936

Teams
In the beginning it was expected that Lokomotiv Tbilisi would be playing in Group B, but later they switched with Dinamo Tbilisi taking their place in the lower Group V.

Competition format 
The winner was planned to play off against the poorest performer of the Group A. The bottom team was planned to be relegated. Wins were accounted for 3 points, draws - 2 points, losses - 1 point, and no-show - no points.

Final standings

Withdrawn teams

Dynamo Kharkiv 
Dynamo Kharkiv withdrew from the competition due to health problems of its players. The club had played against Stalinets Moscow, Stalinets Leningrad, and ZiS Moscow having on record 3 games with 0 wins, 1 draw, 2 losses, and goals ratio 3 - 9. All the records were annulled.

Top goalscorers

1936 Fall

Overview 
This tournament was exact replica of the spring championship by the format of the competition, including the nomination of points.

League standings

See also 
 Soviet First League
 1936 Group A (Soviet football championship) – top tier
 1936 Group V (Soviet football championship) – third tier
 1936 Group G (Soviet football championship) – fourth tier
 1936 Soviet Cup

1936
2
Soviet
Soviet